The Puppy Derby also known as the Juvenile Derby is a greyhound racing competition held annually at Shelbourne Park in Dublin, Ireland. The event switched to Shelbourne following the closure of Harold's Cross Stadium in the city district of Harold's Cross. 

It is a major competition inaugurated in 1943 and is an integral part of the Irish greyhound racing calendar.  The event is the Irish equivalent of the Puppy Derby held in the UK at Wimbledon Stadium. The competition restricted to puppies has a tradition for providing many stars of the future.  Following the closure of Harold's Cross the event was switched to Shelbourne Park in 2017.

Past winners

Venues & Distances
1943–1998 (Harold's Cross 525 yards)
1999–1999 (Shelbourne Park 525 yards)
2000–2016 (Harold's Cross 525 yards)
2017–present (Shelbourne 525 yards)

Sponsors
1994–1994 Red Mills
2007–2012 Harold's Cross Bookmakers
2013–2020 Dublin Coach
2021–2021 SIS
2022–present Racing Post GTV

References

Greyhound racing competitions in Dublin (city)
1943 establishments in Ireland
Recurring sporting events established in 1943